The Opel Patent Motor Car, System Lutzmann (Opel Patentmotorwagen „System Lutzmann“ in German) is the first car from the German automaker Opel. Only 65 vehicles were produced from 1899 to 1902.

Sources
Marcus Schneider: Deutsche Automobile. Edition XXL, Fränkisch-Crumbach 2005, S. 270 (German)

References

External links

 The Opel Patent Motor Car, System Lutzmann (German)
 The Opel Patent Motor Car, System Lutzmann (German)

Patent Motor Car
First car made by manufacturer
Cars introduced in 1899
1900s cars